Maddela is a given name and a surname. Notable people with it include:

 Maddela Abel (1923–2012), Indian political scientist
 Kumari (actress) or Nagaraja Kumari Maddela (1921–2008), Indian actress

See also